A miracle worker is a magician or saint purportedly capable of working magic or miracles. 

Miracle Worker or The Miracle Worker may also refer to:

Film, television, and theatre
The Miracle Worker, a series of dramatic works derived from Helen Keller's 1903 autobiography The Story of My Life
The Miracle Worker (play), a 1959 stage play about Keller
The Miracle Worker (1936 film), a Soviet comedy film
The Miracle Worker (1962 film), an American biographical film starring Anne Bancroft and Patty Duke
The Miracle Worker (1979 film), an American made-for-television biographical film starring Patty Duke and Melissa Gilbert
The Miracle Worker (2000 film), an American biographical television film starring Alison Elliott and Hallie Eisenberg
Miracle Workers (2006 TV series), an American reality television show on ABC
Miracle Workers (2019 TV series), an American comedy television series on TBS

Music
The Miracle Workers, an American rock band
Miracle Worker, a 2000 album by The Rance Allen Group

Songs
"Miracle Worker", a 2011 song by SuperHeavy
"Miracle Worker", a 1976 song by The Chosen Few

Other uses
The Miracle Workers (Vance story), a 1958 novella by Jack Vance

See also
Miracle (disambiguation)